Christopher Andrew John Hemming (born 13 April 1966) is a former footballer who played in the Football League for Stoke City and Wigan Athletic. He is known as the first professional footballer to play whilst having a pacemaker.

Career
Hemming was a product of Stoke's youth system and he made his professional debut in the 1983–84 season which came in a 1–0 defeat away at Tottenham Hotspur on 3 March 1984. He played in the awful 1984–85 season which saw Stoke relegated to the Second Division with a record low points tally. Hemming became a useful member of Mick Mills' squad but he made the national sporting headlines when he was fitted with a pacemaker and still managed to continue playing professional football. He played in 106 games for Stoke before joining Wigan Athletic on loan then permanently to Hereford United in 1989. He later went on to play for non-league Merthyr Tydfil, Macclesfield Town and Stafford Rangers.

Career statistics
Source:

References

External links
 
 Chris Hemming profile at thisnorthernsoul.co.uk

Sportspeople from Newcastle-under-Lyme
English footballers
Stoke City F.C. players
Wigan Athletic F.C. players
Hereford United F.C. players
Merthyr Tydfil F.C. players
Macclesfield Town F.C. players
Stafford Rangers F.C. players
English Football League players
1966 births
Living people
Association football defenders